All Out (stylized in all caps) is the first extended play by virtual girl group K/DA. The EP was released on November 6, 2020, through Riot Games and Stone Music Entertainment. The EP contains five songs which feature vocals from the original line-up (G)I-dle, Madison Beer, and Jaira Burns plus a variety of influential singers, such as Bea Miller, Wolftyla, Lexie Liu, Kim Petras, Aluna, Bekuh Boom, TWICE, and Annika Wells. Each song was produced by one of the fictional members of the group, with the exception of "More".

All Out was preceded by the pre-release single "The Baddest" on August 27, 2020, and lead single "More" on October 28, 2020. Both singles reached number one on the Billboard World Digital Song Sales.

Background and promotion

After releasing "The Baddest" on August 27, 2020, the group released several teaser images starting with Akali, Evelynn, Kai'sa and Ahri with the phrase "#Wherewevebeen #KDA #CallingBlades" on their social media accounts. On September 5, K/DA confirmed that they are working on a collaboration with Seraphine, a fictional virtual influencer after fans have speculated since she has been posting on Twitter, Instagram, and SoundCloud and art style seemed in line with other characters from the game. On her in-character Instagram account, Seraphine confirmed she would serve as one of the producers for the EP. Simultaneously, Riot released the first episode of their new web comic series titled K/DA: Harmonies showing behind-the-scenes of the group's recording process, members encounter, experiences and adventures. On September 28, K/DA unveiled its official fandom lightstick in a shaped of a stage microphone, featuring a black criss-cross pattern on its handle, and their first fan recruitment for Blades, the group's official fandom name.

On October 2, it was announced K/DA's debut extended play title All Out, album's official cover art and multiple pieces of promotional artwork have been released alongside the announcement. It was reported that the lead single will be presented during the 2020 League of Legends World Championship alongside Seraphine, who was rumored to be one of the next champions for League of Legends. On October 9, the group revealed the album track listing. On October 12, Riot Games released new skin for K/DA's members Akali, Evelynn, Ahri, and Kai’Sa including Seraphine. The skin for Seraphine is release as it evolves to become a pop star, from 'Seraphine Indie' 'Seraphine Rising Star' to 'Seraphine Superstar'. Informations about Seraphine as the champion was not clarified, but, it was confirmed later the next day by Riot Games by announcing Seraphine as the new mage winner with music-themed skills. On October 16, Riot Games revealed the full line-up artist which feature five different tracks, with over ten different artists.

Two days after the release of "More", Riot held various events and contents prepared to commemorate the release of K/DA's first EP All Out, through League of Legends, Legends of Runeterra (LoR), Teamfight Tactics (TFT), and League of Legends: Wild Rift. In LoR, a 'K/DA All Out Event Pass' is issued. With this pass, the players get a set of K/DA's limited epic order cards, and purchase a premium event pass to get more rewards and new game mode 'K/DA Star Power'. It is a method in which the player directly selects a card from the deck with each member as the main character. In addition, 'K/DA board', special performance songs are included on the board. In TFT, Feather Knight, Fluffy Tail, Whining, Horn, and Flash will appear in a new form that based on K/DA's concept. It can be purchased as 'K/DA Little Legend Knows' or as an individual appearance from November 12. In Wild Rift, players can earn various rewards by playing the game as a K/DA member champion and performing missions and also purchase the K/DA All Out skin from LoL at Wild Rift. The same day, Logitech's brand Logitech G announced they partnered with Riot Games to launch a set of League of Legends gear with a new K/DA-inspired gaming products. Riot Games also conducts outdoor advertisements by accessing the QR code to 'K/DA Comeback Support Event' displayed on the billboard near Samseong station, Express Terminal and entrance to the Starfield COEX Mall, which are known as spots where idol advertisements are held.

Track listing

Notes

 All track titles are stylized in all caps.

Personnel

 Riot Music Team  – production 
 Sebastien Najand – production 
 Yasuo            – production 
 Oscar Free       – additional vocal production 
 Aaron Aguilar    – additional vocal production 
 Akali            – executive production 
 K/DA             – executive production 
 Seraphine        – executive production 
 Evelynn          – executive production 
 Kai'Sa           – executive production 
 Ahri             – executive production

Accolades

Charts

References

External links

K-pop EPs
2020 debut EPs
Multilingual-language EPs
League of Legends World Championship